Bena was a railway station on the South Gippsland line in South Gippsland, Victoria, Australia. The station was opened during the 1890s, and closed to passenger and parcel traffic on 24 July 1978.

With the realignment of the South Gippsland Highway, the site of the former Bena station is now the location of a "rail over road" bridge.

A longer term South Gippsland Railway project was to include the establishment of a short platform at Bena, for use in conjunction with community events in the township. This comes with the enhancement of community participation within the railway operation, and development of features and attractions on the South Gippsland Railway line.

Prior to its 1978 closure, in March 1976, the platform was shortened from 61m to 23m. The ramped goods platform was also demolished during this time.

External links

Disused railway stations in Victoria (Australia)
Transport in Gippsland (region)
Shire of South Gippsland